Wang Yuhao (born 29 June 1996) is a Chinese footballer.

Career statistics

Club

Notes

References

1996 births
Living people
Chinese footballers
Chinese expatriate footballers
Association football midfielders
Serbian First League players
FK Sloboda Užice players
Chinese expatriate sportspeople in Serbia
Expatriate footballers in Serbia